A prize is an award received for merit

Prize may also refer to:

Media
 The Prize (novel), a 1962 novel by Irving Wallace 
 The Prize (1963 film), a 1963 film based on the novel
 The Prize (2011 film), a 2011 film
 The Prize: The Epic Quest for Oil, Money, and Power, a 1991 book by Daniel Yergin

Other uses
 Prize (law), captured or recovered vessel
 Prize (marketing), promotional item (usually a toy or other small object of nominal value) included free in a retail product
 Prize, California, a former settlement
 Prize money, paid to naval personnel for the successful capture of a ship
 HMS Prize, a UK Royal Navy ship

See also
Price (disambiguation)
Award (disambiguation)